This is a list of rulers in the British Isles. The British Isles are a group of islands in the North Atlantic Ocean off the north-western coast of continental Europe, consisting of the islands of Great Britain, Ireland, the Isle of Man, the Inner and Outer Hebrides, the Northern Isles and over six thousand smaller islands.

In 1603, King James VI of Scotland also became James I of England, joining the crowns of England and Scotland in personal union. By royal proclamation, James styled himself "King of Great Britain", but no such kingdom was actually created until 1707, when England and Scotland united to form the new Kingdom of Great Britain, with a single British parliament sitting at Westminster, during the reign of Queen Anne.

England

House of Wessex

Alfred was king of Wessex from 871.

|-
| Alfred the Greatc. 88626 October 899
| 
| 849Son of Æthelwulf of Wessexand Osburh
| EalhswithGainsborough8685 children
| 26 October 899Aged about 50
| Son of Æthelwulf of WessexTreaty of Wedmore
|

|-
| Edward the Elder26 October 899–17 July 924()
| 
| Son of Alfredand Ealhswith
|  Ecgwynn2 children Ælfflæd8 children Eadgifu4 children
| 17 July 924Aged about 50
| Son of Alfred
|

|}

Disputed
There is some evidence that Ælfweard of Wessex may have been king in 924, between his father Edward the Elder and his brother Æthelstan, although he was not crowned. A 12th-century list of kings gives him a reign length of four weeks, though one manuscript of the Anglo-Saxon Chronicle says he died only 16 days after his father. However, that he ruled is not accepted by all historians. Also, it is unclear whether—if Ælfweard was declared king—it was over the whole kingdom or of Wessex only. One interpretation of the ambiguous evidence is that when Edward died, Ælfweard was declared king in Wessex and Æthelstan in Mercia.

|-
| Ælfweard2 August 924()
|  
| Son of Edward the Elderand Ælfflæd
|  No children
| 2 August 924Aged about 23
| Son of Edward the Elder

|}

|-
| Æthelstan92427 October 939(1415 years)
| 
| 894Son of Edward the Elderand Ecgwynn
|  Unmarried
| 27 October 939Aged about 45
| Son of Edward the Elder
|

|-
| 27 October 93926 May 946()
| 
| Son of Edward the Elderand Eadgifu of Kent
|  Ælfgifu of Shaftesbury2 sons Æthelflæd of Damerham944No children
| 26 May 946PucklechurchKilled in a brawl aged about 25
| Son of Edward the Elder
|

|-
| Eadred26 May 94623 November 955()
| 
| Son of Edward the Elderand Eadgifu of Kent
|  Unmarried
| 23 November 955FromeAged about 32
| Son of Edward the Elder
|

|-
| Eadwig23 November 9551 October 959()
| 
| Son of and Ælfgifu of Shaftesbury
| ÆlfgifuNo verified children
| 1 October 959Aged about 19
| Son of 
|

|-
| Edgar the Peaceful1 October 9598 July 975()
| 
| WessexSon of and Ælfgifu of Shaftesbury
|  Æthelflæd1 son Ælfthryth2 sons
| 8 July 975WinchesterAged 31
| Son of 
|

|-
| Edward the Martyr8 July 97518 March 978()
| 
| Son of Edgar the Peacefuland Æthelflæd
|  Unmarried
| 18 March 978Corfe CastleMurdered aged about 16
| Son of Edgar the Peaceful
|

|-
| (1st reign)ÆthelredÆthelred the Unready18 March 9781013(3435 years)
| 
| Son of Edgar the Peacefuland Ælfthryth
|  Ælfgifu of York9919 children Emma of Normandy10023 children
| 23 April 1016LondonAged about 48
| Son of Edgar the Peaceful
|

|}

House of Denmark

England came under the control of Sweyn Forkbeard, a Danish king, after an invasion in 1013, during which Æthelred abandoned the throne and went into exile in Normandy.

|-
| SweynSweyn Forkbeard25 December 10133 February 1014()
| 
| 17 April 963DenmarkSon of Tove of the Obotritesand Harald Bluetooth
|  Gunhild of Wenden7 children Sigrid the Haughty1 daughter
| 3 February 1014GainsboroughAged 50
| Right of conquest
|

|}

House of Wessex (restored, first time)
Following the death of Sweyn Forkbeard, Æthelred the Unready returned from exile and was again proclaimed king on 3 February 1014. His son succeeded him after being chosen king by the citizens of London and a part of the Witan, despite ongoing Danish efforts to wrest the crown from the West Saxons.

|-
| (2nd reign)ÆthelredÆthelred the Unready3 February 101423 April 1016()
| 
| Son of Edgar the Peacefuland Ælfthryth
|  Ælfgifu of York9919 children Emma of Normandy10023 children
| 23 April 1016LondonAged about 48
| Son of Edgar the Peaceful
| 

|-
| Edmund Ironside23 April 101630 November 1016()
| 
| Son of Æthelredand Ælfgifu of York
| Edith of East Anglia2 children
| 30 November 1016GlastonburyAged 26
| Son of Æthelred
|

|}

House of Denmark (restored)
Following the decisive Battle of Assandun on 18 October 1016, King Edmund signed a treaty with Cnut (Canute) under which all of England except for Wessex would be controlled by Cnut. Upon Edmund's death just over a month later on 30 November, Cnut ruled the whole kingdom as its sole king for nineteen years.

|CanuteCnut the Great18 October 101612 November 1035()
|  
| Son of Sweyn Forkbeardand Gunhilda of Poland
|  Ælfgifu of Northampton2 sons Emma of Normandy10172 children
| 12 November 1035ShaftesburyAged about 40
| Son of SweynTreaty of Deerhurst
|

|-
| Harold Harefoot12 November 103517 March 1040()
| 
| Son of Canuteand Ælfgifu of Northampton
| 
| 17 March 1040OxfordAged about 24
| Son of Canute
|

|-
| Harthacnut17 March 10408 June 1042()
| 
| 1018Son of Canuteand Emma of Normandy
|  Unmarried
| 8 June 1042LambethAged about 24
| Son of Canute
|

|}

House of Wessex (restored, second time)
After Harthacnut, there was a brief Saxon Restoration between 1042 and 1066.

|-
| Edward the Confessor8 June 10425 January 1066()
| 
| IslipSon of Æthelredand Emma of Normandy
| Edith of Wessex23 January 1045No children
| 5 January 1066Westminster PalaceAged about 63
| Son of Æthelred
|

|}

House of Godwin

|-
| Harold Godwinson6 January 106614 October 1066()
| 
| Son of Godwin of Wessexand Gytha Thorkelsdóttir
|  Edith Swannesha5 children Ealdgyth2 sons
| 14 October 1066HastingsDied in battle aged about 44
| Supposedly named heir by Edward the ConfessorElected by the Witenagemot
|

|}

House of Wessex (restored, third time)
After King Harold was killed at the Battle of Hastings, the Witan elected Edgar Ætheling as king. He ruled but was never crowned. He eventually abdicated his kingship and submitted to King William the Conqueror.

|-
| Edgar Ætheling15 October 106617 December 1066()
| 
| Son of Edward the Exileand Agatha
|  Unmarried
| Aged about 75
| Grandson of Edmund IronsideElected by the Witenagemot
| 

|}

House of Normandy

In 1066, several rival claimants to the English throne emerged. Among them were Harold Godwinson, recognised as king by the Witenagemot after the death of Edward the Confessor, as well as Harald Hardrada, King of Norway who claimed to be the rightful heir of Harthacnut, and Duke William II of Normandy, vassal to the King of France, and first cousin once-removed of Edward the Confessor. Harald and William both invaded separately in 1066. Godwinson successfully repelled the invasion by Hardrada, but ultimately lost the throne of England in the Norman conquest of England.

After the Battle of Hastings on 14 October 1066, William the Conqueror made permanent the recent removal of the capital from Winchester to London. Following the death of Harold Godwinson at Hastings, the Anglo-Saxon Witenagemot elected as king Edgar the Ætheling, the son of Edward the Exile and grandson of Edmund Ironside. The young monarch was unable to resist the invaders and was never crowned. William was crowned King William I of England on Christmas Day 1066, in Westminster Abbey, and is today known as William the Conqueror, William the Bastard or William I.

|-
| William the Conqueror25 December 10669 September 1087()
| 
| Falaise CastleSon of Robert the Magnificentand Herleva
| Matilda of FlandersNormandy10539 children
| 9 September 1087RouenAged about 59
| Supposedly named heir in 1052 by Edward the ConfessorFirst cousin once removed of Edward the ConfessorRight of conquest
|

|-
| William Rufus26 September 10872 August 1100()
| 
| NormandySon of William the Conquerorand Matilda of Flanders
|  Unmarried
| 2 August 1100New ForestShot with an arrow aged 44
| Son of Granted the Kingdom of England over elder brother Robert Curthose
|

|-
| Henry Beauclerc5 August 11001 December 1135()
| 
| September 1068SelbySon of William the Conquerorand Matilda of Flanders
|  Matilda of ScotlandWestminster Abbey11 November 11002 children Adeliza of LouvainWindsor Castle29 January 1121No children
| 1 December 1135Saint-Denis-en-LyonsAged 67
| Son of Seizure of the Crown (from Robert Curthose)
| 

|}

House of Blois

Henry I left no legitimate male heirs, his son William Adelin having died in the White Ship disaster. This ended the direct Norman line of kings in England. Henry named his eldest daughter, Matilda (Countess of Anjou by her second marriage to Geoffrey Plantagenet, Count of Anjou, as well as widow of her first husband, Henry V, Holy Roman Emperor), as his heir. Before naming Matilda as heir, he had been in negotiations to name his nephew Stephen of Blois as his heir. When Henry died, Stephen invaded England, and in a coup d'etat had himself crowned instead of Matilda. The period which followed is known as The Anarchy, as parties supporting each side fought in open warfare both in Britain and on the continent for the better part of two decades.

|-
| StephenStephen of Blois22 December 113525 October 1154()
| 
| Matilda of BoulogneWestminster11256 children
| 25 October 1154Dover CastleAged about 58
| Grandson of Appointmentusurpation
|

|}

Disputed claimants

Matilda was declared heir presumptive by her father, Henry I, after the death of her brother on the White Ship, and acknowledged as such by the barons. Upon Henry I's death, the throne was seized by Matilda's cousin, Stephen of Blois. During the ensuing Anarchy, Matilda controlled England for a few months in 1141—the first woman to do so—but was never crowned and is rarely listed as a monarch of England.

|-
| (Title disputed)MatildaEmpress Matilda7 April 11411 November 1141()
| 
| 7 February 1102Sutton CourtenayDaughter of and Edith of Scotland
|   of the Holy Roman EmpireMainz Cathedral6 January 1114No children Geoffrey PlantagenetLe Mans Cathedral22 May 11283 sons
| 10 September 1167RouenAged 65
| Daughter of Seizure of the Crown
|

|}

Count Eustace IV of Boulogne (c. 1130 – 17 August 1153) was appointed co-king of England by his father, King Stephen, on 6 April 1152, in order to guarantee his succession to the throne (as was the custom in France, but not in England). The Pope and the Church would not agree to this, and Eustace was not crowned. Eustace died the next year aged 23, during his father's lifetime, and so never became king in his own right.

House of Anjou

King Stephen came to an agreement with Matilda in November 1153 with the signing of the Treaty of Wallingford, where Stephen recognised Henry, son of Matilda and her second husband Geoffrey Plantagenet, Count of Anjou, as the designated heir. The royal house descended from Matilda and Geoffrey is widely known by two names, the House of Anjou (after Geoffrey's title as Count of Anjou) or the House of Plantagenet, after his sobriquet. Some historians prefer to group the subsequent kings into two groups, before and after the loss of the bulk of their French possessions, although they are not different royal houses.

The Angevins (from the French term meaning "from Anjou") ruled over the Angevin Empire during the 12th and 13th centuries, an area stretching from the Pyrenees to Ireland. They did not regard England as their primary home until most of their continental domains were lost by King John.  The direct, eldest male line from Henry II includes monarchs commonly grouped together as the House of Plantagenet, which was the name given to the dynasty after the loss of most of their continental possessions, while cadet branches of this line became known as the House of Lancaster and the House of York during the War of the Roses.

The Angevins formulated England's royal coat of arms, which usually showed other kingdoms held or claimed by them or their successors, although without representation of Ireland for quite some time. Dieu et mon droit has generally been used as the motto of English monarchs since being adopted by Edward III, but it was first used as a battle cry by Richard I in 1198 at the Battle of Gisors, when he defeated the forces of Philip II of France, after which he made it his motto.

|-
| Henry Curtmantle19 December 11546 July 1189()
| 
| 
| Eleanor of AquitaineBordeaux Cathedral18 May 11528 children
| 6 July 1189ChinonAged 56
| Grandson of Treaty of Wallingford
| 

|-
| Richard the Lionheart3 September 11896 April 1199()
| 
| 
| 8 September 1157Beaumont PalaceSon of and Eleanor of Aquitaine
| Berengaria of NavarreLimassol12 May 1191No children
| 6 April 1199ChâlusShot by a quarrel aged 41
| Son of Primogeniture
|

|-
| JohnJohn Lackland27 May 119919 October 1216()
| 
| 
| 24 December 1166Beaumont PalaceSon of and Eleanor of Aquitaine
|  Isabel of GloucesterMarlborough Castle29 August 1189No children Isabella of AngoulêmeBordeaux Cathedral24 August 12005 children
| 19 October 1216Newark-on-TrentAged 49
| Son of Proximity of blood
| 
|}

Henry II named his son, another Henry (1155–1183), as co-ruler with him. But this was a Norman custom of designating an heir, and the younger Henry did not outlive his father and rule in his own right, so he is not counted as a monarch on lists of kings.

Disputed claimant

Louis VIII of France briefly won about half of England over to his side from 1216 to 1217 at the conclusion of the First Barons' War against King John. On marching into London he was openly received by the rebel barons and citizens of London and proclaimed (though not crowned) king at St Paul's cathedral. Many nobles, including Alexander II of Scotland, gathered to give homage to him. However, in signing the Treaty of Lambeth in 1217, Louis conceded that he had never been the legitimate king of England.

|-
| (Title disputed)Louis the Lion121622 September 1217(1 year)
| 
| 
| 5 September 1187ParisSon of Philip II of Franceand Isabella of Hainault
| Blanche of CastilePort-Mort23 May 120013 children
| 8 November 1226MontpensierAged 39
| Right of conquest
|}

House of Plantagenet

The House of Plantagenet takes its name from Geoffrey Plantagenet, Count of Anjou, husband of the Empress Matilda and father of Henry II. The name Plantagenet itself was unknown as a family name per se until Richard of York adopted it as his family name in the 15th century. It has since been retroactively applied to English monarchs from Henry II onward. It is common among modern historians to refer to Henry II and his sons as the "Angevins" due to their vast continental Empire, and most of the Angevin kings before John spent more time in their continental possessions than in England.

It is from the time of Henry III, after the loss of most of the family's continental possessions, that the Plantagenet kings became more English in nature. The Houses of Lancaster and York are cadet branches of the House of Plantagenet.

|-
| Henry of Winchester28 October 121616 November 1272()
| 
| 
| 1 October 1207Winchester CastleSon of Johnand Isabella of Angoulême
| Eleanor of ProvenceCanterbury Cathedral14 January 12365 children
| 16 November 1272Westminster PalaceAged 65
| Son of JohnPrimogeniture
|

|-
| Edward Longshanks20 November 12727 July 1307()
| 
| 
| 17 June 1239Palace of WestminsterSon of and Eleanor of Provence
|  Eleanor of CastileAbbey of Santa María la Real de Las Huelgas18 October 125416 children Margaret of FranceCanterbury10 September 12993 children
| 7 July 1307Burgh by SandsAged 68
| Son of Primogeniture
|

|-
| Edward of Caernarfon8 July 130720 January 1327()
| 
| 
| 25 April 1284Caernarfon CastleSon of and Eleanor of Castile
| Isabella of FranceBoulogne Cathedral24 January 13084 children
| 21 September 1327Berkeley CastleMurdered aged 43
| Son of Primogeniture
|

|-
| 25 January 132721 June 1377()
| 
| 
| 13 November 1312Windsor CastleSon of and Isabella of France
| Philippa of HainaultYork Minster25 January 132814 children
| 21 June 1377Sheen PalaceAged 64
| Son of Primogeniture
|

|-
| 22 June 137729 September 1399()
| 
| 
| 6 January 1367BordeauxSon of Edward the Black Princeand Joan of Kent
|  Anne of Bohemia14 January 1382No children Isabella of ValoisCalais4 November 1396No children
| 14 February 1400Pontefract CastleAged 33
| Grandson of Primogeniture
|

|}

House of Lancaster

This house descended from Edward III's third surviving son, John of Gaunt. Henry IV seized power from Richard II (and also displaced the next in line to the throne, Edmund Mortimer (then aged 7), a descendant of Edward III's second son, Lionel of Antwerp).

|-
| Henry of Bolingbroke30 September 139920 March 1413()
| 
| 
| 15 April 1367Bolingbroke CastleSon of John of Gauntand Blanche of Lancaster
|  Mary de BohunArundel Castle27 July 13806 children Joanna of NavarreWinchester Cathedral7 February 1403No children
| 20 March 1413Westminster AbbeyAged 45
| Grandsonheir male of Usurpationagnatic primogeniture
|

|-
| 21 March 141331 August 1422()
| 
| 
| 16 September 1386Monmouth CastleSon of and Mary de Bohun
| Catherine of ValoisTroyes Cathedral2 June 14201 son
| 31 August 1422Château de VincennesAged 36
| Son of Agnatic primogeniture
|

|-
| (1st reign)1 September 14224 March 1461()
| 
| 
| 6 December 1421Windsor CastleSon of and Catherine of Valois
| Margaret of AnjouTitchfield Abbey22 April 14451 son
| 21 May 1471Tower of LondonAllegedly murdered aged 49
| Son of Agnatic primogeniture
|

|}

House of York

The House of York claimed the right to the throne through Edward III's second surviving son, Lionel of Antwerp, but it inherited its name from Edward's fourth surviving son, Edmund of Langley, first Duke of York.

The Wars of the Roses (1455–1485) saw the throne pass back and forth between the rival houses of Lancaster and York.

|-
| (1st reign)4 March 14613 October 1470()
| 
| 
| 28 April 1442RouenSon of Richard of Yorkand Cecily Neville
| Elizabeth WoodvilleGrafton Regis1 May 146410 children
| 9 April 1483Westminster PalaceAged 40
| Great-great-grandsonheir general of Seizure of the CrownCognatic primogeniture
|

|}

House of Lancaster (restored)

|-
| (2nd reign)3 October 147011 April 1471()
| 
| 
| 6 December 1421Windsor CastleSon of and Catherine of Valois
| Margaret of AnjouTitchfield Abbey22 April 14451 son
| 21 May 1471Tower of LondonAllegedly murdered aged 49
| Son of Seizure of the Crown
| 

|}

House of York (restored)

|-
| (2nd reign)11 April 14719 April 1483()
| 
| 
| 28 April 1442RouenSon of Richard of Yorkand Cecily Neville
| Elizabeth WoodvilleGrafton Regis1 May 146410 children
| 9 April 1483Westminster PalaceAged 40
| Great-great-grandsonheir general of Seizure of the CrownCognatic primogeniture
| 

|-
| 9 April 148325 June 1483()
| 
| 
| 2 November 1470WestminsterSon of and Elizabeth Woodville
|  Unmarried
| Disappeared mid-1483LondonAllegedly murdered aged 12
| Son of Cognatic primogeniture
| 

|-
| 26 June 148322 August 1485()
| 
| 
| 2 October 1452Fotheringhay CastleSon of Richard of Yorkand Cecily Neville
| Anne NevilleWestminster Abbey12 July 14721 son
| 22 August 1485Bosworth FieldKilled in battle aged 32
| Great-great-grandson of Titulus Regius
|

|}

House of Tudor

The Tudors descended in the female line from John Beaufort, one of the illegitimate children of John of Gaunt (third surviving son of Edward III), by Gaunt's long-term mistress Katherine Swynford. Those descended from English monarchs only through an illegitimate child would normally have no claim on the throne, but the situation was complicated when Gaunt and Swynford eventually married in 1396 (25 years after John Beaufort's birth). In view of the marriage, the church retroactively declared the Beauforts legitimate via a papal bull the same year. Parliament did the same in an Act in 1397. A subsequent proclamation by John of Gaunt's legitimate son, King Henry IV, also recognised the Beauforts' legitimacy, but declared them ineligible ever to inherit the throne. Nevertheless, the Beauforts remained closely allied with Gaunt's other descendants, the Royal House of Lancaster.

John Beaufort's granddaughter Lady Margaret Beaufort was married to Edmund Tudor. Tudor was the son of Welsh courtier Owain Tudur (anglicised to Owen Tudor) and Catherine of Valois, the widow of the Lancastrian King Henry V. Edmund Tudor and his siblings were either illegitimate, or the product of a secret marriage, and owed their fortunes to the goodwill of their legitimate half-brother King Henry VI. When the House of Lancaster fell from power, the Tudors followed.

By the late 15th century, the Tudors were the last hope for the Lancaster supporters. Edmund Tudor's son became king as Henry VII after defeating Richard III at the Battle of Bosworth Field in 1485, winning the Wars of the Roses. King Henry married Elizabeth of York, daughter of Edward IV, thereby uniting the Lancastrian and York lineages. (See family tree.)

With Henry VIII's break from the Roman Catholic Church, the monarch became the Supreme Head of the Church of England and of the Church of Ireland. Elizabeth I's title became the Supreme Governor of the Church of England.

|-
| 22 August 148521 April 1509()
| 
| 
| 28 January 1457Pembroke CastleSon of Edmund Tudorand Margaret Beaufort
| Elizabeth of YorkWestminster Abbey18 January 14868 children
| 21 April 1509Richmond PalaceAged 52
| Great-great-great-grandson of Right of conquest
|

|-
| 22 April 150928 January 1547()
| 
| 
| 28 June 1491Greenwich PalaceSon of and Elizabeth of York
|  Catherine of AragonGreenwich11 June 15091 daughter Anne BoleynWestminster Palace25 January 15331 daughter Jane SeymourWhitehall Palace30 May 15361 son3 further marriagesNo more children
| 28 January 1547Whitehall PalaceAged 55
| Son of Primogeniture
|

|-
| 28 January 15476 July 1553()
| 
| 
| 12 October 1537Hampton Court PalaceSon of and Jane Seymour
|  Unmarried
| 6 July 1553Greenwich PalaceAged 15
| Son of Primogeniture
|

|}

Disputed claimant

Edward VI named Lady Jane Grey as his heir in his will, overruling the order of succession laid down by Parliament in the Third Succession Act. Four days after his death on 6 July 1553, Jane was proclaimed queen—the first of three Tudor women to be proclaimed queen regnant. Nine days after the proclamation, on 19 July, the Privy Council switched allegiance and proclaimed Edward VI's Catholic half-sister Mary queen. Jane was executed for treason in 1554, aged 16.

|-
| (Title disputed)Jane10 July 155319 July 1553(Overthrown after )
| 
| 
| October 1537Bradgate ParkDaughter of the 1st Duke of Suffolkand Frances Brandon
| Guildford DudleyThe Strand21 May 1553No children
| 12 February 1554Tower of LondonExecuted aged 16
| Great-granddaughter of Devise for the Succession
|

|}

|-
| Bloody Mary19 July 155317 November 1558()
| 
| 
| 18 February 1516Greenwich PalaceDaughter of and Catherine of Aragon
| Philip II of SpainWinchester Cathedral25 July 1554No children
| 17 November 1558St James's PalaceAged 42
| Daughter of Third Succession Act
|

|-
| (Jure uxoris)Philip25 July 155417 November 1558()
| 
| 
| 21 May 1527ValladolidSon of Charles V of the Holy Roman Empireand Isabella of Portugal
| Mary I of EnglandWinchester Cathedral25 July 1554No children3 other marriages7 children
| 13 September 1598El EscorialAged 71
| Husband of Act for the Marriage of Queen Mary to Philip of Spain
| 

|}

Under the terms of the marriage treaty between Philip I of Naples (Philip II of Spain from 15 January 1556) and Queen Mary I, Philip was to enjoy Mary's titles and honours for as long as their marriage should last. All official documents, including Acts of Parliament, were to be dated with both their names, and Parliament was to be called under the joint authority of the couple. An Act of Parliament gave him the title of king and stated that he "shall aid her Highness … in the happy administration of her Grace's realms and dominions" (although elsewhere the Act stated that Mary was to be "sole queen"). Nonetheless, Philip was to co-reign with his wife.

As the new King of England could not read English, it was ordered that a note of all matters of state should be made in Latin or Spanish. Coins were minted showing the heads of both Mary and Philip, and the coat of arms of England (pictured right) was impaled with Philip's to denote their joint reign. Acts which made it high treason to deny Philip's royal authority were passed in England  and Ireland. In 1555, Pope Paul IV issued a papal bull recognising Philip and Mary as rightful King and Queen of Ireland.

|-
| 17 November 155824 March 1603()
| 
| 
| 7 September 1533Greenwich PalaceDaughter of and Anne Boleyn
|  Unmarried
| 24 March 1603Richmond PalaceAged 69
| Daughter of Third Succession Act
|

|}

House of Stuart

Following the death of Elizabeth I in 1603 without issue, her first cousin twice removed, King James VI of Scotland, succeeded to the English throne as James I in the Union of the Crowns. James was descended from the Tudors through his great-grandmother, Margaret Tudor, the eldest daughter of Henry VII and wife of James IV of Scotland. In 1604, he adopted the title King of Great Britain. However, the two parliaments remained separate until the Acts of Union 1707.

|-
| 24 March 160327 March 1625()
| 
| 
| 19 June 1566Edinburgh CastleSon of Mary, Queen of Scots and Henry Stuart, Lord Darnley
| Anne of DenmarkOslo23 November 15897 children
| 27 March 1625Theobalds HouseAged 58
| Great-great-grandson of 
|

|-
| 27 March 162530 January 1649()
| 
| 
| 19 November 1600Dunfermline PalaceSon of and Anne of Denmark
| Henrietta Maria of FranceSt Augustine's Abbey13 June 16259 children
| 30 January 1649Whitehall PalaceExecuted aged 48
| Son of Cognatic primogeniture
|

|}

Interregnum

No monarch reigned between the execution of Charles I in 1649 and the Restoration of Charles II in 1660. Between 1649 and 1653, there was no single English head of state, as England was ruled directly by the Rump Parliament with the English Council of State acting as executive power during a period known as the Commonwealth of England. After a coup d'etat in 1653, Oliver Cromwell forcibly took control of England from Parliament. He dissolved the Rump Parliament at the head of a military force and England entered a period known as The Protectorate, under Cromwell's direct control with the title Lord Protector.

It was within the power of the Lord Protector to choose his heir and Oliver Cromwell chose his eldest son, Richard Cromwell, to succeed him. Richard lacked both the ability to rule and confidence of the Army, and he was forcibly removed by the English Committee of Safety under the leadership of Charles Fleetwood in May 1659. England again lacked any single head of state during several months of conflict between Fleetwood's party and that of George Monck. Monck took control of the country in December 1659, and after almost a year of anarchy, the monarchy was formally restored when Charles II returned from France to accept the throne of England. This was following the Declaration of Breda and an invitation to reclaim the throne from the Convention Parliament of 1660.

|+ Lords Protector
|-
| Oliver Cromwell16 December 16533 September 1658()
| 
| 
| 25 April 1599HuntingdonSon of Robert Cromwelland Elizabeth Steward
| Elizabeth BourchierSt Giles22 August 16209 children
| 3 September 1658WhitehallAged 59

|-
| Richard CromwellTumbledown Dick3 September 16587 May 1659()
| 
| 
| 4 October 1626HuntingdonSon of Oliver Cromwelland Elizabeth Bourchier
| Dorothy MaijorMay 16499 children
| 12 July 1712CheshuntAged 85

|}

House of Stuart (restored)

After the Monarchy was restored, England came under the rule of Charles II, whose reign was relatively peaceful domestically, given the tumultuous time of the Interregnum years. Tensions still existed between Catholics and Protestants. With the ascension of Charles's brother, the openly Catholic James II, England was again sent into a period of political turmoil.

James II was ousted by Parliament less than three years after ascending to the throne, replaced by his daughter Mary II and her husband (also his nephew) William III during the Glorious Revolution. While James and his descendants would continue to claim the throne, all Catholics (such as James and his son Charles) were barred from the throne by the Act of Settlement 1701, enacted by Anne, another of James's Protestant daughters. After the Acts of Union 1707, England as a sovereign state ceased to exist, replaced by the new Kingdom of Great Britain.

|-
| (Recognised by Royalists in 1649)29 May 16606 February 1685()
| 
| 
| 29 May 1630St James's PalaceSon of and Henrietta Maria of France
| Catherine of BraganzaPortsmouth21 May 1662No children
| 6 February 1685Whitehall PalaceAged 54
| Son of Cognatic primogenitureEnglish Restoration
|

|-
| 6 February 168523 December 1688(Overthrown after )
| 
| 
| 14 October 1633St James's PalaceSon of and Henrietta Maria of France
|  Anne HydeThe Strand3 September 16608 children Mary of ModenaDover21 November 16737 children
| 16 September 1701Château de Saint-Germain-en-LayeAged 67
| Son of Cognatic primogeniture
|

|-
| 13 February 168928 December 1694()| 
| 
| 30 April 1662St James's PalaceDaughter of and Anne Hyde
| William III of EnglandSt James's Palace4 November 1677No children
| 28 December 1694Kensington PalaceAged 32
| Daughter of Offered the Crown by Parliament
|

|-
| William of Orange13 February 16898 March 1702()| 
| 
| 4 November 1650The HagueSon of William II of Orangeand Mary of England
| Mary II of EnglandSt James's Palace4 November 1677No children
| 8 March 1702Kensington PalaceAged 51
| Grandson of Offered the Crown by Parliament
|

|-
| Anne8 March 17021 May 1707()(Queen of Great Britain until1 August 1714)()
| 
| 
| 6 February 1665St James's PalaceDaughter of and Anne Hyde
| George of DenmarkSt James's Palace28 July 1683No surviving children
| 1 August 1714Kensington PalaceAged 49
| Daughter of Cognatic primogenitureBill of Rights 1689
|

|-
! class=noprint colspan=2 style="font-weight:normal" |  
! class=noprint colspan=6 style="font-weight:normal" | 

|}

Wales

King of Wales was a very rarely used title, because Wales, much like Ireland, never achieved a degree of political unity, like that of England or Scotland during the Middle Ages. While many different leaders in Wales claimed the title of 'King of Wales', the country was only truly united once and that occurred under the rule of Gruffydd ap Llywelyn from 1055 to 1063.

Scotland
House of Alpin (848–1034)

The reign of Kenneth MacAlpin begins what is often called the House of Alpin, an entirely modern concept. The descendants of Kenneth MacAlpin were divided into two branches; the crown would alternate between the two, the death of a king from one branch often hastened by war or assassination by a pretender from the other. Malcolm II was the last king of the House of Alpin; in his reign, he successfully crushed all opposition to him and, having no sons, was able to pass the crown to his daughter's son, Duncan I, who inaugurated the House of Dunkeld.

*Eochiad was a son of Run, King of Strathclyde, but his mother was a daughter of Kenneth I. Evidence of his reign is unclear. He may have never actually been king and if he was, he was co-king with Giric.

‡Amlaíb is known only by a reference to his death in 977, which reports him as King of Alba; since Kenneth II is known to have still been King in 972–973, Amlaíb must have taken power between 973 and 977.

House of Dunkeld (1034–1286)

Duncan succeeded to the throne as the maternal grandson of Malcolm II. He was also the heir-general of Malcolm I, as his paternal grandfather, Duncan of Atholl was the third son of Malcolm I. The House of Dunkeld was therefore closely related to the House of Alpin. Duncan was killed in battle by Macbeth, who had a long and relatively successful reign. In a series of battles between 1057 and 1058, Duncan's son Malcolm III defeated and killed Macbeth and Macbeth's stepson and heir Lulach, claiming the throne. The dynastic feuds did not end there: on Malcolm III's death in battle, his brother Donald III, known as "Bán", claimed the throne, expelling Malcolm III's sons from Scotland. A civil war in the family ensued, with Donald III and Malcolm III's son Edmund opposed by Malcolm III's English-backed sons, led first by Duncan II and then by Edgar. Edgar triumphed, sending his uncle and brother to monasteries. After the reign of David I, the Scottish throne was passed according to rules of primogeniture, moving from father to son, or where not possible, brother to brother.

House of Sverre (1286–1290)

The status of Margaret, Maid of Norway, as a Scottish monarch is debated by historians. One of her biographers, Archie Duncan, argues that because she was "never inaugurated, she was never queen of Scots". Another, Norman H. Reid, insists that Margaret was "accepted as queen" by her contemporaries but that, owing to the lack of Inauguration, "[her] reign never started".

First Interregnum (1290–1292)

Monarchy of Scotland restored

House of Balliol (1292–1296)

The death of Margaret of Norway began a two-year interregnum in Scotland caused by a succession crisis. With her death, the descent of William I became extinct and there was no obvious heir. Thirteen candidates presented themselves; the most prominent were John Balliol, great-grandson of William I's younger brother David of Huntingdon, and Robert de Brus, 5th Lord of Annandale, David of Huntingdon's grandson. The Scottish magnates invited Edward I of England to arbitrate the claims. He did so but forced the Scots to swear allegiance to him as overlord. Eventually, it was decided that John Balliol should become king. He proved weak and incapable and, in 1296, was forced to abdicate by Edward I who then attempted to annex Scotland into the Kingdom of England.

Second Interregnum (1296–1306)

Monarchy of Scotland restored (second time)

House of Bruce (1306–1371)

For ten years, Scotland had no king. The Scots, however, refused to tolerate English rule. First William Wallace then John Comyn and finally Robert the Bruce (the grandson of the 1292 competitor, Robert de Brus, 5th Lord of Annandale) fought against the English. Bruce and his supporters had murdered their rival to the throne of Scotland, John Comyn, on 10 February 1306 at Greyfriars Church in Dumfries. Shortly after in 1306, Robert was crowned King of Scots at Scone. Robert Bruce was then hunted down for his crime of murder, and subsequently he escaped to the outskirt islands. Leaving the country completely leaderless and the English invaded once again. Bruce would return a year later and gain support for his cause. His energy, and the corresponding replacement of the vigorous Edward I with his weaker son Edward II in 1307, allowed Scotland to free itself from English rule. At the Battle of Bannockburn in 1314, the Scots routed the English, and by 1328 the English had agreed by treaty to accept Scottish independence. Robert's son, David, acceded to the throne as a child. The English renewed their war with Scotland, and David was forced to flee the kingdom by Edward Balliol, son of King John, who managed to get himself crowned (1332–1356) and to give away Scotland's southern counties to England before being driven out again. David spent much of his life in exile, first in freedom with his ally, France, and then in prison in England. He was only able to return to Scotland in 1357. Upon his death, childless, in 1371, the House of Bruce came to an end.

Disputed claimant

House of Balliol (1332–1356)
Edward Balliol was the son of King John Balliol, who had himself ruled for four years following his election in the Great Cause. Following his abdication, John Balliol lived out his life in obscurity in Picardy, France. During the minority of David II, Edward Balliol seized the opportunity to assert his claim to the throne, and backed by the English, he defeated the forces of David's regency and was himself crowned king at Scone in 1332. He was quickly defeated by loyalist forces, and sent back to England.  With English support, he would mount two more attempts to seize the throne again, in 1333 and 1335, each time his actual control of the throne was brief before being sent back to England, for the last time in 1336.  When David returned from exile in 1341 to rule in his own right, Edward lost most of his support.  When David II was captured in battle in 1346, Edward made one last attempt to seize the throne for himself, but had little support and the campaign fizzled before it gained much traction. In 1356 he renounced all claims to the throne.

House of Stewart/Stuart (1371–1651)

Robert the Stewart was a grandson of Robert I by the latter's daughter, Marjorie. Having been born in 1316, he was older than his uncle, David II. Consequently, he was at his accession a middle aged man, already 55, and unable to reign vigorously, a problem also faced by his son Robert III, who also ascended in middle age at 53 in 1390, and suffered lasting damage in a horse-riding accident. These two were followed by a series of regencies, caused by the youth of the succeeding five boy kings. Consequently, the Stewart era saw periods of royal inertia, during which the nobles usurped power from the crown, followed by periods of personal rule by the monarch, during which he or she would attempt to address the issues created by their own minority and the long-term effects of previous reigns. Governing Scotland became increasingly difficult, as the powerful nobility became increasingly intractable. James I's attempts to curb the disorder of the realm ended in his assassination. James III was killed in a civil war between himself and the nobility, led by his own son. When James IV, who had governed sternly and suppressed the aristocrats, died in the Battle of Flodden, his wife Margaret Tudor, who had been nominated regent for their young son James V, was unseated by noble feuding, and James V's own wife, Mary of Guise, succeeded in ruling Scotland during the regency for her young daughter Mary I only by dividing and conquering the noble factions, distributing French bribes with a liberal hand. Finally, Mary I, the daughter of James V, found herself unable to govern Scotland faced with the surliness of the aristocracy and the intransigence of the population, who favoured Calvinism and disapproved of her Catholicism. She was forced to abdicate, and fled to England, where she was imprisoned in various castles and manor houses for eighteen years and finally executed for treason against the English queen Elizabeth I. Upon her abdication, her son, fathered by Henry, Lord Darnley, a junior member of the Stewart family, became King as James VI.

James VI became King of England and Ireland as James I in 1603, when his cousin Elizabeth I died. Thereafter, although the two crowns of England and Scotland remained separate, the monarchy was based chiefly in England. Charles I, James's son, found himself faced with Civil War. The resultant conflict lasted eight years, and ended in his execution. The English Parliament then decreed their monarchy to be at an end. The Scots Parliament, after some deliberation, broke their links with England, and declared that Charles II, son and heir of Charles I, would become King. He ruled until 1651 when the armies of Oliver Cromwell occupied Scotland and drove him into exile.

Third Interregnum (1651–1660)

Monarchy of Scotland restored (third time)
House of Stuart restored (1660–1707)
With the Scottish Restoration, the Stuarts became Kings of Scotland once more but Scotland's rights were not respected. During the reign of Charles II the Scottish Parliament was dissolved and James was appointed Governor of Scotland. James II himself became James VII in 1685. His Catholicism was not tolerated, and he was driven out of England after three years. In his place came his daughter Mary and her husband William of Orange, the ruler of the Dutch Republic. The two were accepted as monarchs of Scotland after a period of deliberation by the Scottish Parliament, and ruled together as William II and Mary II.

An attempt to establish a Scottish colonial empire through the Darien Scheme, in rivalry to that of England, failed, leaving the Scottish nobles who financed the venture for their own profit bankrupt. This coincided with the accession of Queen Anne, daughter of James VII. Anne had multiple children but none of these survived her, leaving as her heir her half-brother, James, then living in exile in France. The English favoured the Protestant Sophia of Hanover (a granddaughter of James VI) as heir. Many Scots preferred Prince James, who as a Stuart was a Scot by ancestry, and threatened to break the Union of Crowns between England and Scotland by choosing him for themselves. To preserve the union, the English elaborated a plan whereby the two Kingdoms of Scotland and England would merge into a single Kingdom, the Kingdom of Great Britain, ruled by a common monarch, and with a single Parliament. Both national parliaments agreed to this (the Scots albeit reluctantly, motivated primarily by the national finances), and some subterfuge as a total majority of signatories was needed to ratify the Scottish parliament's assent, bribes and payments. Thereafter, although monarchs continued to rule over the nation of Scotland, they did so first as monarchs of Great Britain, and from 1801 of the United Kingdom.

Britain
House of Stuart (1707–1714)

Anne had been Queen of England, Scotland and Ireland since 8 March 1702, and so became Queen of Great Britain upon the Union of England and Scotland. (Her total reign was 12 years and 21 weeks.)

|-
! class=noprint colspan=2 style="font-weight:normal" |  
! class=noprint colspan=6 style="font-weight:normal" | 
|-
| Anne1 May 17071 August 1714()| 
| 
| 6 February 1665St James's PalaceDaughter of James II and VIIand Anne Hyde
| Prince George of DenmarkSt James's Palace28 July 1683No surviving children
| 1 August 1714Kensington PalaceAged: 
| Daughter of James II and VIICognatic primogenitureBill of Rights 1689
| 

|}

House of Hanover (1714–1901)

The Hanoverian succession came about as a result of the Act of Settlement 1701, passed by the Parliament of England, which excluded "Papists" (i.e. Roman Catholics) from the succession. In return for access to the English plantations in North America and the West Indies, the Hanoverian succession and the Union were ratified by the Parliament of Scotland in 1707.

After the death of Anne, with no living children, her second cousin, George Louis, was the closest heir to the throne who was not Catholic. George was the son of Sophia of Hanover—granddaughter of James VI and I through his daughter Elizabeth.  The Hanoverian kings of Great Britain retained their German titles, first as electors of Hanover/dukes of Brunswick-Lüneburg and later as kings of Hanover; the two lands were ruled as separate states in personal union.  The Hanoverian lands were separated when Queen Victoria ascended the throne of Great Britain; as German succession law prevented women from inheriting the Hanoverian throne, her uncle Ernest Augustus inherited in her stead.

|-
| George Louis1 August 171411 June 1727()| 
| 
| 28 May 1660LeineschlossSon of Ernest Augustus of Brunswick-Lüneburgand Sophia of Hanover
| Sophia Dorothea of Brunswick-Lüneburg-Celle21 November 16822 children
| 11 June 1727OsnabrückAged 
| Great-grandson of Act of SettlementEldest son of Sophia of Hanover
| 

|-
| George Augustus11 June 172725 October 1760()| 
| 
| 30 October 1683HerrenhausenSon of and Sophia Dorothea of Brunswick-Lüneburg-Celle
| Caroline of Brandenburg-Ansbach22 August 1705Herrenhausen8 children
| 25 October 1760Kensington PalaceAged 
| Son of 
| 

|-
| George William Frederick25 October 176029 January 1820()| 
| 
| 4 June 1738Norfolk HouseSon of Prince Frederickand Augusta of Saxe-Gotha
| Charlotte of Mecklenburg-StrelitzSt James's Palace8 September 176115 children
| 29 January 1820Windsor CastleAged 
| Grandson of 
| 

|-
| George Augustus Frederick29 January 182026 June 1830()| 
| 
| 12 August 1762St James's PalaceSon of and Charlotte of Mecklenburg-Strelitz
|  Maria FitzherbertPark Lane15 September 1785No verified children Caroline of Brunswick-WolfenbüttelSt James's Palace8 April 17951 daughter
| 26 June 1830Windsor CastleAged 
|rowspan=2|Sons of 
| 

|-
| William Henry26 June 183020 June 1837()| 
| 
| 21 August 1765Buckingham PalaceSon of and Charlotte of Mecklenburg-Strelitz
| Adelaide of Saxe-MeiningenKew Palace13 July 18182 daughters
| 20 June 1837Windsor CastleAged 
| 

|-
| VictoriaAlexandrina Victoria20 June 183722 January 1901()| 
| 
| 24 May 1819Kensington PalaceDaughter of the Duke of Kent and Strathearnand Victoria of Saxe-Coburg-Saalfeld
| Albert of Saxe-Coburg and GothaSt James's Palace10 February 18409 children
| 22 January 1901Osborne Houseaged 
| Granddaughter of 
| 

|}

Houses of Saxe-Coburg and Gotha (1901–1917) and Windsor (from 1917)

Because his father, Albert, Prince Consort, was of the House of Saxe-Coburg and Gotha, Edward VII inaugurated a new royal house when he succeeded his mother Victoria, the last monarch of the House of Hanover, in 1901. George V changed the name of the House of Saxe-Coburg-Gotha to the House of Windsor on 17 July 1917, during the First World War, because of wartime anti-German sentiment in the country. Descendants of Prince Philip, Duke of Edinburgh and Queen Elizabeth II belong to the House of Windsor by Royal Command (9 April 1952 Declaration by Queen Elizabeth II to her Privy Council) although under the usual rules of genealogy they are, by paternal descent, also members of the Glücksburg branch of the House of Oldenburg (the ruling House of Denmark and of the former Kingdom of Greece). Accordingly, King Charles III is the first monarch of the House of Windsor who is a patrilineal descendant of the Glücksburg dynasty.

|-
| Albert Edward22 January 19016 May 1910()| 
| 
| 9 November 1841Buckingham PalaceSon of Queen Victoriaand Albert of Saxe-Coburg-Gotha
| Alexandra of DenmarkSt George's Chapel10 March 18636 children
| 6 May 1910Buckingham Palaceaged 
| Son of Victoria
| 
|-
| George Frederick Ernest Albert6 May 191020 January 1936()| 
| 
| 3 June 1865Marlborough HouseSon of and Alexandra of Denmark
| Mary of TeckSt James's Palace6 July 18936 children
| 20 January 1936Sandringham Houseaged 
| Son of 
| 
|-
| Edward Albert Christian George Andrew Patrick David20 January 193611 December 1936(Abdicated after )| 
| 
| 23 June 1894White LodgeSon of and Mary of Teck
| Wallis SimpsonChâteau de Candé3 June 1937No children
| 28 May 1972Neuilly-sur-Seineaged 
|rowspan=2|Sons of 
| 
|-
| Albert Frederick Arthur George11 December 19366 February 1952()| 
| 
| 14 December 1895Sandringham HouseSon of and Mary of Teck
| Elizabeth Bowes-LyonWestminster Abbey26 April 19232 daughters
| 6 February 1952Sandringham Houseaged 
| 
|-
| Elizabeth Alexandra Mary6 February 1952 8 September 2022| 
| 
| 21 April 1926MayfairDaughter of and Elizabeth Bowes-Lyon
| Prince Philip of Greece and DenmarkWestminster Abbey20 November 19474 children
| 8 September 2022Balmoral Castle  Aged 96 Years,  140 Days
| Daughter of 
| 
|-
| Charles Philip Arthur George8 September 2022present()
| 
| 
| 14 November 1948  Buckingham Palace Son of and Prince Philip, Duke of Edinburgh
|   Diana SpencerSt Paul's Cathedral29 July 19812 sons  Camilla Parker Bowles St George's Chapel 9 April 2005No children
| Living
| Son of 
| 
|}

See also 

 Alternative successions of the English crown
 Bretwalda
 Demise of the Crown
 English monarchs' family tree
 Family tree of English and British monarchs
 Heptarchy
 List of English consorts
 List of British monarchs
 List of Irish monarchs
 List of monarchs of the British Isles by cause of death
 List of monarchs of Wessex
 Lists of monarchs in the British Isles
 List of rulers of the United Kingdom and predecessor states
 List of rulers of Wales
 List of Scottish monarchs
 Line of succession to the British throne
 Mnemonic verses of monarchs in England
 Succession to the British throne
 List of legendary kings of Britain

Notes

Coronations

References

External links 

 
 
 

 
English
Monarchs